Cloacina elegans is a species of parasitic nematodes in the family Chabertiidae. Members of the species are parasites of marsupials in Australia.

References

External links 

 Cloacina elegans at gbif.org

Strongylida
Nematodes described in 1938
Invertebrates of Australia
Parasitic nematodes of mammals
Parasites of marsupials
Marsupials of Australia